Mango Airlines SOC Ltd, trading as Mango, was a South African low-cost airline based at the OR Tambo International Airport, and a subsidiary of South African Airways. Since July 2021, the airline had been grounded, as funding for its business rescue was subject to a dispute. However in August 2022 its license was suspended altogether.

History
Mango was launched on 30 October 2006, with bookings going on sale at midnight on the same date. Mango's first flight took place on 15 November 2006. Mango planned to join Star Alliance as a Connecting Partner in the third quarter of 2016, but the plan has been put on hold due to South African Airways' financial state.

Mango was grounded due to non-payments and debt to ACSA (Airports Company of South Africa) on 28 April 2021. No Mango airliners were allowed to either depart or land at any ACSA airport in South Africa as of 28 April 2021. Only a statement of apology was issued by the company. As of then, it was to be seen if any money from government which was granted to South African Airways (of which Mango is a subsidiary) was to be allocated to Mango as a bailout. However it never resumed operations and in August 2022, the South African authorities suspended the airlines license altogether for at least two years.

Corporate affairs

Ownership
Mango was 100% owned by South African Airways, which is itself owned by the government of South Africa, but Mango operates independently as a low-cost airline with its own Board and balance sheet.

Head office
Mango's head office was at OR Tambo International Airport in Kempton Park, Ekurhuleni, Gauteng, on the mezzanine level of the Domestic Departure Terminal.

Business trends
Financial and operational figures for Mango were fully incorporated within the SAA Group figures. Not all the results in the Group reports are broken down to subsidiary level, however, and therefore some figures below are from press reports. As of March 2020, no results for Mango have been released for 2018 and 2019 because SAA has not itself released its Group results. (Figures below as at year ending 31 March:)

Destinations
Before having all of its flights grounded on 28 April 2021, Mango served the following destinations:

Historical Fleet

, the Mango fleet consisted of the following aircraft:

Services

In-flight services
As a low-cost airline, Mango featured a uniform fleet of aircraft with high seating density. Mango also offered online ticketing. A standard booking did not include food and drinks. Mango offered a buy on board programme offering food and drinks for purchase.

Mango provided an in-flight magazine Mango Juice and used to offer Mango TV, a former daily in flight entertainment programme viewable on the drop-down televisions placed throughout the aircraft. In-flight Wi-Fi was also available on all flights for a fee. Wi-Fi services were provided by G-Connect, a local internet broadband provider.

Frequent-flyer program
South African Airways Voyager members could redeem SAA Voyager miles with Mango, but were not yet able to earn SAA Voyager miles with Mango. No other SAA Voyager benefits, such as additional baggage, upgrades or lounge access, were applicable when using SAA Voyager miles to pay for a Mango flight.

See also
Kulula.com, another defunct South African low-cost airline

References

External links

 Official website

Defunct airlines of South Africa
Airlines established in 2006
Airlines disestablished in 2021
South African companies established in 2006
Companies based in Ekurhuleni
Kempton Park, Gauteng
South African brands
South African Airways
Low-cost carriers